Sündeviin Byambatseren (born 24 March 1990, in Ömnögovi Province) is a Mongolian freestyle wrestler. She competed in the freestyle 55 kg event at the 2012 Summer Olympics and was eliminated by Sofia Mattsson in the qualifications.

References

External links
 

1990 births
Living people
Mongolian female sport wrestlers
Olympic wrestlers of Mongolia
Wrestlers at the 2012 Summer Olympics
People from Ömnögovi Province
Asian Games medalists in wrestling
Wrestlers at the 2014 Asian Games
Asian Games silver medalists for Mongolia
Medalists at the 2014 Asian Games
21st-century Mongolian women